Carl Schröter (May 29, 1887 – February 25, 1952) was a German politician of the Christian Democratic Union (CDU) and former member of the German Bundestag.

Life 
On 26 February 1946, he was appointed by the British occupying power as a member of the Landtag of Schleswig-Holstein. Schröter subsequently also belonged to the second appointed Landtag and was a member of the Landtag elected via the Landesliste from 1947 until his resignation on 21 May 1950, where he was chairman of the CDU Landtag faction and thus also leader of the opposition. In addition, Schröter was a member of the Zone Advisory Council of the British occupation zone in 1947–48 and the Parliamentary Council in 1948–49.

From 1949 until his death, he was a directly elected member of parliament for the Segeberg - Neumünster constituency and finally a member of the German Bundestag, where he was deputy chairman of the CDU/CSU parliamentary group from 17 January 1950.

Literature

References

1887 births
1952 deaths
Members of the Bundestag for Schleswig-Holstein
Members of the Bundestag 1949–1953
Members of the Bundestag for the Christian Democratic Union of Germany
Members of the Landtag of Schleswig-Holstein